RR Centauri  is a variable star of apparent magnitude maximum +7.29. It is located in the constellation of Centaurus, approximately 320 light years distant from the solar system.

The system is a contact binary of the W UMa type - two stars in physical contact whose two components share a gaseous envelope. Its spectral type is A9V or F0V. The binary nature of the star was discovered in 1896 by the Scottish-South African astronomer Alexander Roberts, so the system has been well observed for over a century. The primary component has a mass of 1.82 solar masses, an effective temperature of around 6900 K, and a radius somewhat larger than twice the solar radius. The secondary component is 0.39 solar masses, giving a mass ratio of the system (q) of 0.210. the secondary has a temperature of about 6890 K and a radius is almost equal to the solar radius.

The orbital period of this system is 0.6057 days (14.53 hours). Recent calculations by astronomers from the Chinese Academy of Sciences show a possible cyclic variation in orbital period over  65.1 ± 0.4 years whose amplitude is 0.0124 ± 0.0007 days.  The origin of this periodic variation could be due to the gravitational influence of a third object yet observed. Superimposed on this variation seems to be a secular increase in the period of 1.21 x 10 –7 days per year, suggesting that there is transfer of stellar mass from secondary to primary component. If this increase is confirmed, RR Centauri may evolve into a single rapidly rotating star.

RR Centauri is also an eclipsing binary, whose apparent brightness varies by around 0.41 magnitudes.

References

W Ursae Majoris variables
Centauri, RR
J14165721-5751156
069779
124689
F-type main-sequence stars
CD-57 5498
Centaurus (constellation)